Tuck may refer to:

People
 Tuck (surname), including a list of people
 Tuck (nickname), a list of people
 Tuck (footballer), Portuguese football player and coach João Carlos Novo de Araújo Gonçalves (born 1969)
 Hillary Tuck (born 1978), American actress born Hillary Sue Hedges
 Tuck Langland, American sculptor
 Tuck Woolum, American former college football player and head coach
 Trinity the Tuck, American drag performer Ryan A. Taylor (born 1984)

Fictional characters
 Friar Tuck, one of Robin Hood's Merry Men
 Tuck, a pill bug in the 1998 animated film A Bug's Life
 Tuck, the family name of characters in the novel Tuck Everlasting and two film adaptations
 Turtle Tuck, in the animated series Wonder Pets
 Tuck, in the animated series My Life as a Teenage Robot

Sports
 Back or front tuck, a type of acrobatic flip
 One of several dive positions

Other uses
 Tuck (sewing), a fold or pleat in fabric that is sewn in place
 Tuck (sword), also known as an estoc in French
 Tuck School of Business, the graduate business school of Dartmouth College, Hanover, New Hampshire, United States
 Tuck Baronets, a title in the Baronetage of Great Britain
 Tuck, Kentucky, an unincorporated community
 Mount Tuck, Ellsworth Mountains, Antarctica
 Tuck, third novel in the King Raven Trilogy, by Stephen R. Lawhead
 Tuck., botanical author abbreviation for Edward Tuckerman (1817–1886), American botanist and professor

See also
 Mach tuck, a dangerous change in pitching tendency of some aircraft during transonic flight
 Tuck shop, a small retailer selling food
 Krewe of Tucks, New Orleans Mardi Gras krewe
 Tucking
 Tuk (disambiguation)